Ziadiyah is a town in northern Aleppo Governorate, northwestern Syria.

Administratively the town belongs to Nahiya Akhtarin in A'zaz District. Nearby localities include Ghurur  to the east, and Turkman Bareh  to the southwest. In the 2004 census, Ziadiyah had a population of 3,576.

References

Populated places in Syria